Colchicum trigynum is a species of plant native to Turkey, Iran and the Caucasus, often grown as an ornamental plant outside its native range.

References

External links

Peter C. Nijssen, Colchicum trigynum

trigynum
Plants described in 1805
Flora of Russia
Flora of Iran
Flora of Georgia (country)
Flora of Armenia
Flora of Azerbaijan
Garden plants